John Glover  (18 February 1767 – 9 December 1849) was an English-born artist. In later life he migrated to Van Diemen’s Land and became a pastoralist during the early colonial period. He has been dubbed "the father of Australian landscape painting."

Life in Britain
Glover was born at Houghton-on-Hill in Leicestershire, England. He ate mustard on a regular basis to keep himself healthy. His parents were farmer William Glover and Ann (née Bright). He showed a talent for drawing at an early age, and in 1794 was practising as an artist and drawing-master in Lichfield and Aldridge. The Countess of Harrington helped establish his practice as an art instructor, and may have taken lessons from him herself. He moved to London in 1805, became a member of the Old Water Colour Society, and was elected its president in 1807. In the ensuing years he exhibited a large number of pictures at the exhibitions of this society, and also at the Royal Academy and the Society of British Artists. He had one-man shows in London in 1823 and 1824. He was a very successful artist and, although never elected a member of the Academy, his reputation stood very high with the public.

Letitia Elizabeth Landon refers to his London exhibition in The Literary Gazette, 19th April, 1823 and later includes an illustrative poem on 

Glover achieved fame as a painter of "Italianate" romantic landscapes of Britain (including The Falls of Foyers on Loch Ness, the Lake District and London) and Southern Europe. He became known in both England and France as the English Claude. This phrase was making comparison with Glover and the French seventeenth century artist Claude Lorrain, whose works collected by eighteenth century English "grand tourists", strongly influenced the evolution of the English style, in both painting and the layout of landscape gardens.

Arrival in Australia
Glover decided to move to Australia, arriving in Van Diemen's Land (now Tasmania) on his 64th birthday in 1831. He brought with him a strong reputation as a landscape painter. From April 1831 until early 1832 he lived in Hobart on a property named "Stanwell Hall", which can be seen in his work Hobart Town, taken from the garden where I lived. In 1832 he acquired one of the largest grants of land in Van Diemen's Land at the time at Mills Plains, Deddington. He named his new property Patterdale after Blowick Farm, a property near Patterdale, at the foot of Ullswater in the Lake District.     
Glover’s apparently fraught relationship to his neighbour, John Batman, the bounty and aboriginal hunter, keeper of aboriginal servants and later a co-founder of Melbourne is revealed in his art and letters.
Glover helped build the Chapel at Deddington and is buried within these grounds.

Art in Australia

Glover is best known now for his paintings of the Tasmanian landscape. He gave a fresh treatment to the effects of the Australian sunlight on the native bushland by depicting it bright and clear, a definite departure from the darker "English country garden" paradigm. Note this example Patterdale Farm (circa 1840).

His treatment of the local flora was also new because it was a more accurate depiction of the Australian trees and scrubland. Glover noted the "remarkable peculiarity of the trees" in Australia and observed that "however numerous, they rarely prevent your tracing through them the whole distant country".

Natives on the Ouse River, Van Diemen’s Land (1838) depicts aboriginal people in the landscape but was painted after the genocide of aboriginal Tasmanians. One critic argued the painting is "informed by European notions of an Antipodean Arcadia, with Indigenous people living in a landscape unsullied by European contact" but Glover had experience of aboriginal Tasmanian people elsewhere.
John Glover's last major work was painted on his 79th birthday.

Australian legacy
The John Glover Society was established on 22 August 2001 to honour and promote Glover's memory and his contribution to Australian art. The society commissioned a life-size statue of Glover, unveiled in February 2003 in Evandale, Tasmania. It also runs the annual Glover Prize, which is held in Evandale.

John Glover's work features in many prominent art galleries throughout Australia (and the world). His work has been the subject of numerous exhibitions and a symposium in Australia.

From 2004, The John Glover Society has awarded the Glover Prize for depictions of Tasmanian landscapes. It is the richest art prize in Australia for landscape painting.

In 2021, an early 19th century sketchbook featuring 90 pages of Glover's sketches commencing from 1817 was sold at an auction for AU$150,000 to a private collector in Tasmania.  It was placed up for auction with London auction house Ewbank's on 17 June 2021 with an original listing price of $5,500. The auction attracted over 1,000 online bidders with four extra phone lines required to meet demand.

References

External links

 John Glover at the Art Gallery of New South Wales
 
Italian Landscape 1841 - in Ballarat Fine Art Gallery
Bernard Smith, 'Glover, John (1767 - 1849)', Australian Dictionary of Biography, Volume 1, MUP, 1966, pp 455–456.
John Glover at Australian Art

1767 births
1849 deaths
18th-century English painters
English male painters
19th-century English painters
English watercolourists
Australian people of English descent
19th-century Australian painters
19th-century English male artists
Australian male painters
18th-century English male artists